The men's hammer throw at the 2017 World Championships in Athletics is being held at the Olympic Stadium on 9 and 11 August.

Summary

The final started with Aleksei Sokirskiy (ANA)'s 76.22 m early leader.  Wojciech Nowicki (POL) slightly improved upon that to 77.36 m but the next thrower Quentin Bigot (FRA) hit the first round leader 77.05 m on the next throw.  Near the end of the round, Valeriy Pronkin (ANA) moved into second place with his 77.00 m.  In the second round, Sokirskiy improved to 77.50 m, while Olympic champion Dilshod Nazarov (TJK) moved into second with his best of the day 77.22m.  In the third round, Nick Miller (GBR) put himself into bronze medal position with his 77.31 m best, but two throws later Nowicki threw his best of 78.03 m to take the lead followed by Bigot improving to 77.46 m.  Near the end of the round, 2017 #1 Paweł Fajdek (POL) took a big lead with a 79.73 m.  In the fourth round, Bigot again improved, 77.67 m enough to move into bronze position.  At the end of the round, Fajdek threw his best of the day .  Two throws later, in the fifth round, Pronkin's 77.98 m leapfrogged him from seventh place to silver.  He then improved upon that with a 78.16 m in the final round.  It was the third silver medal for Authorised Neutral Athletes.

Records
Before the competition records were as follows:

No records were set at the competition.

Qualification standard
The standard to qualify automatically for entry was 76.00 metres.

Schedule
The event schedule, in local time (UTC+1), is as follows:

Results

Qualification
The qualification round took place on 9 August, in two groups, with Group A starting at 19:22 and Group B starting at 20:50. Athletes attaining a mark of at least 75.50 metres ( Q ) or at least the 12 best performers ( q ) qualified for the final. The overall results were as follows:

Final
The final took place on 11 August at 20:30. The results were as follows:

References

Hammer throw
Hammer throw at the World Athletics Championships
2017 in men's athletics